The Combined Space Operations Center (CSpOC) is a U.S.–led multinational space operations center that provides command and control of space forces for United States Space Command's Combined Force Space Component Command. The CSpOC is located at Vandenberg Space Force Base.

Mission
The mission of the Combined Space Operations Center is to "Execute operational command and control of space forces to achieve theater and global objectives."

Structure 
The Combined Space Operations Center is organized into six different elements:
 Combat Operations Division (COD): responsible for executing the space tasking order and performing command and control of space forces.
 Strategy and Plans Division (SPD): creates the Joint Space Operations Plan (JSOP), the Space Operations Directive (SOD), Master Space Plan (MSP), Operational Assessments (OA), Combined Space Tasking Orders (CSTO), as well as any other special instructions and standards. It not only plans space operations, but also integrates air and cyber plans.
 Intelligence, Surveillance, and Reconnaissance Division (ISRD): provides space intelligence to CSpOC elements.
 55th Combat Training Squadron (55 CTS): provides advanced training, standardization and evaluation, weapons and tactics, system integration, exercise and experimentation, space weather, and special technical operations support functions for the CSpOC. Each of these functions correlate to a flight within the squadron.
 65th Cyber Squadron (65 CYS): provides communication support for the CSpOC.
 Commercial Integration Cell (CIC): integrates commercial space organizations, such as commercial satellite owners and operators, into the CSpOC, enabling greater communication between military and commercial space.

History 

The Joint Space Operations Center (JSpOC) was initially established on 18 May 2005 to control all joint military space assets. It was organized under U.S. Strategic Command's Joint Force Space Component Commander. The core cadre of personnel from the Joint Space Operations Center was provided by the Air Force's 614th Air Operations Center (now Space Force's Space Delta 5), but other space personnel from the Army, Navy, and Marine Corps also were tasked to the JSpOC.

On 18 July 2018 it was redesignated as the Combined Space Operations Center, reorganizing to improve coordination between the United States and its allies, as well as between commercial and civil space organizations. The Combined Space Operations Center is a strategic defense partnership between the United States, Australia, Canada, and the United Kingdom. Other collaborating countries include France, Germany, and New Zealand.

List of directors 

 Col Scott D. Brodeur, 8 June 2018
 Col Monique C. DeLauter, 24 July 2020
 Col Phillip A. Verroco, 24 May 2022

See also 
 614th Air Operations Center

Notes

External links 
 
 

Multinational units and formations
Space units and formations of the United States
Military units and formations in California
Vandenberg Space Force Base
Military units and formations established in 2005